Judah Colt (July 1, 1761 – October 11, 1832) was an early pioneer of Erie County.

Hill country
Colt was born on July 1, 1761 in Lyme, Connecticut. He left Connecticut in 1795 and moved to Erie County. He soon decided that the lake shore was inhospitable, so he looked to join earlier pioneers in the hill country south of Erie. In 1796, he attempted to buy thousands of acres of land from the Pennsylvania Population Company, but they declined, hiring him instead to replace Thomas Rees, Jr. as their agent, a job he held until his death in 1832.

Colt established Colt's Station in 1797 in present-day Greenfield. That same year he built the "earliest road after the American occupation" in Erie County (after Old French Road) as a supply route from Lake Erie. Soon goods that were traveling by ship from Buffalo, New York to Erie were being transported overland to his settlement. He extended the road in early 1798 to French Creek, where he established a boat landing. He continued the road to the forks of the creek at Wattsburg later that same year.

Colt's wife joined him at Colt's Station in May 1798. In the absence of a minister, Colt conducted the first Protestant service in the county on July 2, 1797.

City life
Colt realized that prosperity would be found near the lake, so he left Colt's Station for Erie in 1804. He joined the Presbyterian church in Erie that formed in September 1815, attending worship services in the old court house and soon becoming an elder. He built a frame building on Sassafras Street, known locally as the "yellow meeting house", which became the first regular place of worship in Erie.  Colt was elected a member of the American Antiquarian Society in July 1815.

He served three terms as Burgess in Erie (1813, 1820-1821). Colt died in Erie on October 11, 1832 and is buried in the Erie Cemetery.

References

 Nelson's Biographical Dictionary And Historical Reference Book of Erie County, Pennsylvania, Vol. I. Erie: S. B. Nelson, 1896. Reprinted by Erie County Historical Society (Salem, WV: Don Mills Inc, 1987), pp. 110, 120, 138, 313, 437.

External links
 Judah Colt, Historical Markers, Explore PA History
 Judah Colt Daybook (1798-1799)
 Greenfield Twp Before 1810
 Erie Cemetery Association biography
 200th Anniversary of the Presbytery of Lake Erie quotes Colt journal in 1801
 Turner, Orasmus. Pioneer History of the Holland Purchase of Western New York (Buffalo: Jewett, Thompson and Co, 1849), p. 372

1761 births
1832 deaths
People from Lyme, Connecticut
People from Erie, Pennsylvania
Members of the American Antiquarian Society